The USA Today High School Football Player of the Year is the award given by USA Today to the best offensive and defensive high school football players in America.

The award has been given since 1982, the year the newspaper began, and each player was part of the USA Today All-USA high school football team.

Winners

Offense

Defense

See also
USA Today All-USA high school football team

References

High school football trophies and awards in the United States
Most valuable player awards
USA Today
Awards by newspapers
Awards established in 1982
1982 establishments in the United States